The Cabinet of Tanzania is the most senior level of the executive branch of Tanzania and consists of the President, Vice President, President of Zanzibar, Prime Minister and all the Ministers. Deputy Ministers are not part of the cabinet.

Current Cabinet

See also
 Magufuli cabinet
 Kikwete Cabinet
 Deputy Ministers of Tanzania
 Previous Cabinets in Tanzania

References

 
Tanzania